Carlos Zeferino Torreblanca Galindo (born March 14, 1954 in Guadalajara, Jalisco) is a Mexican politician previously affiliated with the  Party of the Democratic Revolution now affiliated with the  (Labor Party) and former Governor of Guerrero. He is the first non PRI member to hold the position.

Personal life and education
Zeferino Torreblanca is the son of Luis Torreblanca González and Luisa Galindo Ochoa.  He holds a bachelor's degree in accounting from the Monterrey Institute of Technology and Higher Education (ITESM).

Political career
In 1993 he unsuccessfully ran for municipal president (mayor) of Acapulco representing the PRD. Then, in 1994, he secured a seat in the Chamber of Deputies of Mexico via proportional representation to serve during the LVI Legislature. In 1999 he ran again for municipal president of Acapulco and won. In February 2005 he was elected Governor of Guerrero and left office on March 31, 2011.

See also
 List of mayors of Acapulco (municipality)

References

1954 births
Living people
Party of the Democratic Revolution politicians
Municipal presidents in Guerrero
Members of the Chamber of Deputies (Mexico)
Governors of Guerrero
Monterrey Institute of Technology and Higher Education alumni
Politicians from Guadalajara, Jalisco
20th-century Mexican politicians
21st-century Mexican politicians